John W. Scibak (born May 4, 1953) is an American politician who represents the 2nd Hampshire District in the Massachusetts House of Representatives. He is a former South Hadley, Massachusetts Town Meeting Member (1990–2002) and was a member of the South Hadley Board of Selectmen from 1991 to 2002.

He was born in Woonsocket, Rhode Island.

References

1953 births
Living people
People from Woonsocket, Rhode Island
People from South Hadley, Massachusetts
University of Notre Dame alumni
Democratic Party members of the Massachusetts House of Representatives
21st-century American politicians